Mike Morris is the name of:

 Mike Morris (physicist), physics professor at Butler University
 Mike Morris (TV presenter) (1946–2012), British television presenter
 Mike Morris (long snapper) (born 1961), former American football player
 Mike Morris (defensive end) (born 2001), American football defensive end
 Mike Morris (ice hockey) (born 1983), American professional ice hockey forward
 Mike Morris (politician), Minister of Public Safety and Solicitor General of British Columbia
 Mike Morris (coach), head women's basketball coach at Samford University 
 Mike Morris, singer of Faith No Man, an early incarnation of Faith No More

See also
 Michael Morris (disambiguation)